Lutetium phosphide is an inorganic compound of lutetium and phosphorus with the chemical formula . The compound forms dark crystals, does not dissolve in water.

Synthesis
Heating powdered lutetium and red phosphorus in an inert atmosphere or vacuum:
4Lu + P4 -> 4LuP

It can also be formed in the reaction of lutetium and phosphine.

Physical properties
Lutetium phosphide forms dark cubic crystals, space group Fmm, cell parameters a = 0.5533 nm, Z = 4.

Stable in air, does not dissolve in water and reacts actively with nitric acid.

Uses
The compound is a semiconductor used in high power, high-frequency applications, and in laser diodes.

Also used in gamma radiation detectors due to its ability to absorb radiation.

References

Phosphides
Lutetium compounds
Semiconductors
Rock salt crystal structure